Alpine skiing at the 2009 European Youth Olympic Winter Festival was held from 16 to 20 February 2009. It was held in Szczyrk, Poland.

Results

Medal table

Men's events

Women's events

References 

2009 European Youth Olympic Winter Festival
2009 in alpine skiing
2009